Rofecoxib is a COX-2 selective nonsteroidal anti-inflammatory drug (NSAID). It was marketed by Merck & Co. to treat osteoarthritis, rheumatoid arthritis, juvenile rheumatoid arthritis, acute pain conditions, migraine, and dysmenorrhea. Rofecoxib was approved in the US by the US Food and Drug Administration (FDA) in May 1999, and was marketed under the brand names Vioxx, Ceoxx, and Ceeoxx. Rofecoxib was available by prescription in both tablet-form and as an oral suspension.

Rofecoxib gained widespread use among physicians treating patients with arthritis and other conditions causing chronic or acute pain. Worldwide, over 80 million people were prescribed rofecoxib at some time.

In September 2004, Merck voluntarily withdrew rofecoxib from the market because of concerns about increased risk of heart attack and stroke associated with long-term, high-dosage use. Merck withdrew the drug after disclosures that it withheld information about rofecoxib's risks from doctors and patients for over five years, allegedly resulting in between 88,000 and 140,000 cases of serious heart disease. Rofecoxib was one of the most widely used drugs ever to be withdrawn from the market. In the year before withdrawal, Merck had sales revenue of US$2.5 billion from Vioxx.

In 2005 the FDA issued a memo concluding that risks for serious cardiovascular (CV) events seem to be as great for non-selective NSAIDs as for COX-2 selective agents such as rofecoxib, according to long-term controlled clinical trials. Based on data up to 2015, the FDA reasserted the likelihood of an increased risk of serious adverse cardiovascular events from COX-2 selective and non-selective NSAIDs, dependent on dose and duration.

In November 2017, Massachusetts-based Tremeau Pharmaceuticals announced its plan to return rofecoxib (TRM-201) to market as a treatment for hemophilic arthropathy (HA). Tremeau announced that the FDA had granted an orphan designation for TRM-201 (rofecoxib) for the treatment of HA, and that they had received FDA feedback on their development plan. HA is a degenerative joint disease caused by recurrent intra-articular bleeding. It is the largest cause of morbidity in patients with hemophilia and has no currently approved treatment options in the United States. Traditional NSAIDs are avoided in this population due to their effects on platelet aggregation and risk of gastrointestinal ulcers, and high potency opioids are the current standard of care in treating HA.

Mode of action

Cyclooxygenase (COX) has two well-studied isoforms, called COX-1 and COX-2. COX-1 mediates the synthesis of prostaglandins responsible for protection of the stomach lining, while COX-2 mediates the synthesis of prostaglandins responsible for pain and inflammation. By creating "selective" NSAIDs that inhibit COX-2, but not COX-1, the same pain relief as traditional NSAIDs is offered, but with greatly reduced risk of fatal or debilitating peptic ulcers. Rofecoxib is a selective COX-2 inhibitor, or "coxib".

Though the class of coxibs includes several agents, there are varying degrees of COX-2 selectivity among them, with celecoxib (Celebrex) being the least COX-2 selective, and rofecoxib (Vioxx), valdecoxib (Bextra), and etoricoxib (Arcoxia), being highly COX-2 selective.

At the time of its withdrawal, rofecoxib was the only coxib approved in the United States with clinical evidence of its superior gastrointestinal adverse effect profile over conventional NSAIDs. This was largely based on the VIGOR (Vioxx GI Outcomes Research) study, which compared the efficacy and adverse effect profiles of rofecoxib and naproxen.

Pharmacokinetics
The therapeutic recommended dosages were 12.5, 25, and 50 mg with an approximate bioavailability of 93%. Rofecoxib crossed the placenta and blood–brain barrier, and took 1–3 hours to reach peak plasma concentration with an effective half-life (based on steady-state levels) of approximately 17 hours. The metabolic products are cis-dihydro and trans-dihydro derivatives of rofecoxib which are primarily excreted through urine.

Efficacy 
Rofecoxib was approved by the FDA to treat osteoarthritis, rheumatoid arthritis, juvenile rheumatoid arthritis, acute pain conditions, migraine, and dysmenorrhea. When it was marketed, it gained widespread acceptance among physicians treating patients with arthritis and other conditions causing chronic or acute pain.

Premenstrual acne 
A 2003 placebo-controlled small short-term study in India of 80 women with premenstrual acne vulgaris acne, were given rofecoxib or placebo for 2 cycles of 10 days suggest that "rofecoxib is effective in the management of premenstrual acne.

Fabricated efficacy studies
On March 11, 2009, Scott S. Reuben, former chief of acute pain at Baystate Medical Center, Springfield, Mass., revealed that data for 21 studies he had authored for the efficacy of the drug (along with others such as celecoxib) had been fabricated, overstating the analgesic effects of the drugs. There is no evidence that Reuben colluded with Merck in falsifying his data. Reuben was also a former paid spokesperson for the drug company Pfizer (which owns the intellectual property rights for marketing celecoxib in the United States). The retracted studies were not submitted to either the FDA or the European Union's regulatory agencies prior to the drug's approval. Drug manufacturer Merck had no comment on the disclosure.

Side effects

In addition to the reduced incidence of gastric ulceration, rofecoxib exhibits no effect on bleeding time or platelet aggregation, even at supra-therapeutic doses.  Aside from these features, rofecoxib exhibits a similar adverse effect profile to other NSAIDs.

Heart and blood vessels

VIGOR study and publishing controversy
The VIGOR (Vioxx GI Outcomes Research) study, conducted by Bombardier, et al., compared the efficacy and adverse effect profiles of a supra-therapeutic dose of rofecoxib (50 mg/day) vs. a common dose of naproxen (500 mg/BID), had indicated a significant 4-fold increased risk of acute myocardial infarction (heart attack) in rofecoxib patients when compared with naproxen patients (0.4% vs 0.1%, RR 0.25) over a mean duration of 9-months. The elevated risk began during the second month on rofecoxib. There was no significant difference in the mortality from cardiovascular events between the two groups, nor was there any significant difference in the rate of myocardial infarction between the rofecoxib and naproxen treatment groups in patients without high cardiovascular risk. The difference in overall risk was by the patients at higher risk of heart attack, i.e. those meeting the criteria for low-dose aspirin prophylaxis of secondary cardiovascular events (previous myocardial infarction, angina, cerebrovascular accident, transient ischemic attack, or coronary artery bypass).

Merck's scientists interpreted the finding as a protective effect of naproxen, telling the FDA that the difference in heart attacks "is primarily due to" this protective effect. The Martin Report excused senior management by stating they believed they were victims of Pfizer's alleged manipulation of test results to promote their product as a safer alternative. Some commentators have noted that naproxen would have to be three times as effective as aspirin to account for all of the difference, and some outside scientists warned Merck that this claim was implausible before VIGOR was published. No evidence has since emerged for such a large cardioprotective effect of naproxen, although a number of studies have found protective effects similar in size to those of aspirin.

The results of the VIGOR study were submitted to the United States Food and Drug Administration (FDA) in February 2001. In September 2001, the FDA sent a warning letter to the CEO of Merck, stating, "Your promotional campaign discounts the fact that in the VIGOR study, patients on Vioxx were observed to have a four to five fold increase in myocardial infarctions (MIs) compared to patients on the comparator non-steroidal anti-inflammatory drug (NSAID), Naprosyn (naproxen)." This led to the introduction, in April 2002, of warnings on Vioxx labeling concerning the increased risk of cardiovascular events (heart attack and stroke).

Months after the preliminary version of VIGOR was published in the New England Journal of Medicine in November 2000, the journal editors learned that certain data reported to the FDA were not included in the NEJM article. Several years later, when they were shown a Merck memo during the depositions for the first federal Vioxx trial, they realized that these data had been available to the authors months before publication. The editors wrote an editorial accusing the authors of deliberately withholding the data. They released the editorial to the media on December 8, 2005, before giving the authors a chance to respond. NEJM editor Gregory Curfman explained that the quick release was due to the imminent presentation of his deposition testimony, which he feared would be misinterpreted in the media. He had earlier denied any relationship between the timing of the editorial and the trial. Although his testimony was not actually used in the December trial, Curfman had testified well before the publication of the editorial.

The editors charged that "more than four months before the article was published, at least two of its authors were aware of critical data on an array of adverse cardiovascular events that were not included in the VIGOR article." These additional data included three additional heart attacks, and raised the relative risk of Vioxx from 4.25-fold to 5-fold. All the additional heart attacks occurred in the group at low risk of heart attack (the "aspirin not indicated" group) and the editors noted that the omission "resulted in the misleading conclusion that there was a difference in the risk of myocardial infarction between the aspirin indicated and aspirin not indicated groups." The relative risk for myocardial infarctions among the aspirin not indicated patients increased from 2.25 to 3 (although it remained statistically insignificant). The editors also noted a statistically significant (2-fold) increase in risk for serious thromboembolic events for this group, an outcome that Merck had not reported in the NEJM, though it had disclosed that information publicly in March 2000, eight months before publication.

The authors of the study, including the non-Merck authors, responded by claiming that the three additional heart attacks had occurred after the prespecified cutoff date for data collection and thus were appropriately not included. (Utilizing the prespecified cutoff date also meant that an additional stroke in the naproxen population was not reported.) Furthermore, they said that the additional data did not qualitatively change any of the conclusions of the study, and the results of the full analyses were disclosed to the FDA and reflected on the Vioxx warning label. They further noted that all of the data in the "omitted" table were printed in the text of the article. The authors stood by the original article.

NEJM stood by its editorial, noting that the cutoff date was never mentioned in the article, nor did the authors report that the cutoff for cardiovascular adverse events was before that for gastrointestinal adverse events. The different cutoffs increased the reported benefits of Vioxx (reduced stomach problems) relative to the risks (increased heart attacks).

Some scientists have accused the NEJM editorial board of making unfounded accusations. Others have applauded the editorial. Renowned research cardiologist Eric Topol, a prominent Merck critic, accused Merck of "manipulation of data" and said "I think now the scientific misconduct trial is really fully backed up". Phil Fontanarosa, executive editor of the prestigious Journal of the American Medical Association, welcomed the editorial, saying "this is another in the long list of recent examples that have generated real concerns about trust and confidence in industry-sponsored studies".

On May 15, 2006, the Wall Street Journal reported that a late night email, written by an outside public relations specialist and sent to Journal staffers hours before the Expression of Concern was released, predicted that "the rebuke would divert attention to Merck and induce the media to ignore the New England Journal of Medicines own role in aiding Vioxx sales."

"Internal emails show the New England Journal's expression of concern was timed to divert attention from a deposition in which Executive Editor Gregory Curfman made potentially damaging admissions about the journal's handling of the Vioxx study. In the deposition, part of the Vioxx litigation, Dr. Curfman acknowledged that lax editing might have helped the authors make misleading claims in the article." The Journal stated that NEJMs "ambiguous" language misled reporters into incorrectly believing that Merck had deleted data regarding the three additional heart attacks, rather than a blank table that contained no statistical information; "the New England Journal says it didn't attempt to have these mistakes corrected." Investigations revealed that Merck had several years worth of information suggesting an elevated risk of cardiac events, and Vice President Edward Scolnick took much of the blame for the suppression of this information.

The FDA reviewers were aware of the potential for cardiovascular risk in 1999and it was argued that Merck had manipulated their EKG tests one week after the external review board provided their consultation to specifically exclude high risk factors from the trial subjects to avoid finding effect then predated the changes to their trials to almost three months earlier.

Alzheimer's disease
In 2000 and 2001, Merck conducted several studies of rofecoxib aimed at determining if the drug slowed the onset of Alzheimer's disease. Merck has placed great emphasis on these studies on the grounds that they are relatively large (almost 3000 patients) and compared rofecoxib to a placebo rather than to another pain reliever. These studies found an elevated death rate among rofecoxib patients, although the deaths were not generally heart-related. However, they did not find any elevated cardiovascular risk due to rofecoxib. Before 2004, Merck cited these studies as providing evidence, contrary to VIGOR, of rofecoxib's safety.

APPROVe study
In 2001, Merck commenced the APPROVe (Adenomatous Polyp PRevention On Vioxx) study, a three-year trial with the primary aim of evaluating the efficacy of rofecoxib for the prophylaxis of colorectal polyps. Celecoxib had already been approved for this indication, and it was hoped to add this to the indications for rofecoxib as well. An additional aim of the study was to further evaluate the cardiovascular safety of rofecoxib.

The APPROVe study was terminated early when the preliminary data from the study showed an increased relative risk of adverse thrombotic cardiovascular events (including heart attack and stroke), beginning after 18 months of rofecoxib therapy. In patients taking rofecoxib, versus placebo, the relative risk of these events was 1.92 (rofecoxib 1.50 events vs placebo 0.78 events per 100 patient years). The results from the first 18 months of the APPROVe study did not show an increased relative risk of adverse cardiovascular events. Moreover, overall and cardiovascular mortality rates were similar between the rofecoxib and placebo populations.

In summary, the APPROVe study suggested that long-term use of rofecoxib resulted in nearly twice the risk of suffering a heart attack or stroke compared to patients receiving a placebo.

Other studies
Pre-approval Phase III clinical trials, like the APPROVe study, showed no increased relative risk of adverse cardiovascular events for the first eighteen months of rofecoxib usage (Merck, 2004). Others have pointed out that "study 090", a pre-approval trial, showed a three-fold increase in cardiovascular events compared to placebo, a seven-fold increase compared to nabumetone (another [NSAID]), and an eight-fold increase in heart attacks and strokes combined compared to both control groups. Although this was a relatively small study and only the last result was statistically significant, critics have charged that this early finding should have prompted Merck to quickly conduct larger studies of rofecoxib's cardiovascular safety. Merck notes that it had already begun VIGOR at the time Study 090 was completed. Although VIGOR was primarily designed to demonstrate new uses for rofecoxib, it also collected data on adverse cardiovascular outcomes.

Several very large observational studies have also found elevated risk of heart attack from rofecoxib. For example, a recent retrospective study of 113,000 elderly Canadians suggested a borderline statistically significant increased relative risk of heart attacks of 1.24 from Vioxx usage, with a relative risk of 1.73 for higher-dose Vioxx usage. (Levesque, 2005). Another study, using Kaiser Permanente data, found a 1.47 relative risk for low-dose Vioxx usage and 3.58 for high-dose Vioxx usage compared to current use of celecoxib, though the smaller number was not statistically significant, and relative risk compared to other populations was not statistically significant. (Graham, 2005).

Furthermore, a more recent meta-study of 114 randomized trials with a total of 116,000+ participants, published in JAMA, showed that Vioxx uniquely increased risk of renal (kidney) disease, and heart arrhythmia.

Other COX-2 inhibitors
In 2005, the FDA issued a memo concluding that along with the other approved COX-2 selective NSAIDs available at the time (i.e., celecoxib, and valdecoxib), rofecoxib was associated with an increased risk of serious adverse CV events compared to placebo. They also noted that the available data did not permit a rank ordering of these drugs with regard to CV risk.

Only Celebrex (generic name is celecoxib) is still available for purchase in the United States.

Regulatory authorities worldwide now require warnings about cardiovascular risk of COX-2 inhibitors still on the market. For example, in 2005, EU regulators required the following changes to the product information and/or packaging of all COX-2 inhibitors:

 Contraindications stating that COX-2 inhibitors must not be used in patients with established ischaemic heart disease and/or cerebrovascular disease (stroke), and also in patients with peripheral arterial disease
 Reinforced warnings to healthcare professionals to exercise caution when prescribing COX-2 inhibitors to patients with risk factors for heart disease, such as hypertension, hyperlipidaemia (high cholesterol levels), diabetes and smoking
 Given the association between cardiovascular risk and exposure to COX-2 inhibitors, doctors are advised to use the lowest effective dose for the shortest possible duration of treatment

Other NSAIDs
Since the withdrawal of Vioxx it has come to light that there may be negative cardiovascular effects with not only other COX-2 inhibitiors, but even the majority of other NSAIDs. It is only with the recent development of drugs like Vioxx that drug companies have carried out the kind of well executed trials that could establish such effects and these sort of trials have never been carried out in older "trusted" NSAIDs such as ibuprofen, diclofenac and others. The possible exceptions may be aspirin and naproxen due to their anti-platelet aggregation properties.

Analyses in 2011 and 2013 by McGettigan and the Coxib and traditional NSAID Trialists (CNT) Collaborators, respectively, demonstrated that the risk of serious CV events was a dose dependent effect of COX-2 selective and nonselective NSAIDs, with the possible exception of naproxen, and high therapeutic doses of nonselective NSAIDs (e.g. ibuprofen 2400 mg/day, diclofenac 150 mg/day) carried similar CV risk when compared to a combined group of therapeutic and supra-therapeutic doses of COX-2 selective  NSAIDs (such as rofecoxib).

In 2014, Patrono and Baigent, summarizing all of the currently available data in a review article in Circulation, concluded that with the exception of GI toxicity, neither the efficacy nor the major cardiorenal complications of COX-2 selective NSAIDs appear to be influenced by their level of COX-2 selectivity. They concluded that the CV risk associated with NSAIDs was dependent on dose and duration.

This conclusion was further reinforced by the 2016 results of the celecoxib PRECISION trial, which showed no difference in CV event rates between the COX-2 selective NSAID celecoxib and the non-selective NSAIDs ibuprofen and naproxen.

Withdrawal
Due to the findings of its own APPROVe study, Merck publicly announced its voluntary withdrawal of the drug from the market worldwide on September 30, 2004.

In addition to its own studies, on September 23, 2004, Merck apparently received information about new research by the FDA that supported previous findings of increased risk of heart attack among rofecoxib users (Grassley, 2004). One FDA analyst estimated that, based upon his mathematical model, Vioxx may have caused between 88,000 and 139,000 heart attacks, 30 to 40 percent of which were probably fatal, in the five years the drug was on the market. Senior FDA officials were quick to note, however, that this estimate was based solely on a mathematical model, and must be interpreted with caution.

On November 5, 2004, the medical journal The Lancet published a meta-analysis of the available studies on the safety of rofecoxib (Jüni et al., 2004). The authors concluded that, owing to the known cardiovascular risk, rofecoxib should have been withdrawn several years earlier. The Lancet published an editorial which condemned both Merck and the FDA for the continued availability of rofecoxib from 2000 until the recall. Merck responded by issuing a rebuttal of the Jüni et al. meta-analysis that noted that Jüni omitted several studies that showed no increased cardiovascular risk.

Merck-sponsored "Martin Report", 2006

In 2005, Merck spent $21 million US to retain John S. Martin Jr., a former US District Judge for the Southern District of New York, and colleagues at Debevoise & Plimpton LLP, to investigate Vioxx study results and communications conducted by Merck. The report, which Merck called the "Martin Report", was published in February 2006. The report found that Merck's senior management acted in good faith, and that the confusion over the clinical safety of Vioxx was due to the sales team's overzealous behavior. The report that was filed gave a timeline of the events surrounding Vioxx and stated that Merck intended to operate honestly throughout the process. Any mistakes that were made regarding the mishandling of clinical trial results and withholding of information were described as the result of oversight, not malicious behavior. The report did conclude that the Merck's marketing team exaggerated the safety of Vioxx and replaced truthful information with sales tactics. Merck was satisfied with the findings of the report it had commissioned, and promised to consider the recommendations. The report was criticised in the press as self-serving. Merck insisted that the report was independent and Merck "had no effect at all on the findings and the conclusions". Merck hoped that the report would improve public perception of Merck.

FDA position
In 2005, advisory panels in both the US and Canada encouraged the return of rofecoxib to the market, stating that Rofecoxib's benefits outweighed the risks for some patients. The FDA advisory panel voted 17-15 to allow the drug to return to the market despite being found to increase heart risk. The vote in Canada was 12-1, and the Canadian panel noted that the cardiovascular risks from rofecoxib seemed to be no worse than those from ibuprofen—though the panel stated that further study was needed for all NSAIDs to fully understand their risk profiles. Notwithstanding these recommendations, Merck has not returned rofecoxib to the market.

Following the 2005 FDA Advisory Committee, the FDA issued a memo concluding that data from large long-term controlled clinical trials do not clearly demonstrate that COX-2 selective agents (including rofecoxib) have a greater risk of serious cardiovascular events than non-selective NSAIDs.

In 2015, the FDA reinforced this conclusion, stating that the available data support a dose and duration dependent class effect of an increased risk of serious adverse cardiovascular events for COX-2 selective and non-selective NSAIDs.

Litigation
By March 2006, there were over 10,000 cases and 190 class actions filed against Merck over adverse cardiovascular events associated with rofecoxib and the adequacy of Merck's warnings. The first wrongful death trial, Rogers v. Merck, was scheduled in Alabama in the spring of 2005, but was postponed after Merck argued that the plaintiff had falsified evidence of rofecoxib use.

On August 19, 2005, a jury in Texas voted 10–2 to hold Merck liable for the death of Robert Ernst, a 59-year-old man who allegedly died of a rofecoxib-induced heart attack. Merck argued that the death was due to cardiac arrhythmia, which had not been shown to be associated with rofecoxib use. The jury awarded Carol Ernst, widow of Robert Ernst, $253.4 million in damages. This award was capped at no more than US$26.1 million because of punitive damages limits under Texas law. Merck appealed and the verdict was overturned in 2008.
On November 3, 2005, Merck won the second case Humeston v. Merck, a personal injury case, in Atlantic City, New Jersey. The plaintiff experienced a mild myocardial infarction and claimed that rofecoxib was responsible, after having taken it for two months. Merck argued that there was no evidence that rofecoxib was the cause of Humeston's injury and that there is no scientific evidence linking rofecoxib to cardiac events with short durations of use. The jury ruled that Merck had adequately warned doctors and patients of the drug's risk.

The first federal trial on rofecoxib, Plunkett v. Merck, began on November 29, 2005, in Houston. The trial ended on December 12, 2005, when Judge Eldon E. Fallon of U.S. District Court declared a mistrial because of a hung jury with an eight to one majority, favoring the defense. Upon retrial in February 2006 in New Orleans, where the Vioxx multidistrict litigation (MDL) is based, a jury found Merck not liable, even though the plaintiffs had the NEJM editor testify as to his objections to the VIGOR study.

On January 30, 2006, a New Jersey state court dismissed a case brought by Edgar Lee Boyd, who blamed Vioxx for gastrointestinal bleeding that he experienced after taking the drug. The judge said that Boyd failed to prove the drug caused his stomach pain and internal bleeding.

In January 2006, Garza v. Merck began trial in Rio Grande City, Texas. The plaintiff, a 71-year-old smoker with heart disease, had a fatal heart attack three weeks after finishing a one-week sample of rofecoxib. On April 21, 2006 the jury awarded the plaintiff $7 million compensatory and $25 million punitive. The Texas Courts of Appeals in San Antonio later ruled Garza's fatal heart attack probably resulted from pre-existing health conditions unrelated to his taking of Vioxx, thus reversing the $32 million jury award.

On April 5, 2006, a jury held Merck liable for the heart attack of 77-year-old John McDarby, and awarded McDarby $4.5 million in compensatory damages based on Merck's failure to properly warn of Vioxx safety risks. After a hearing on April 11, 2006, the jury also awarded Mr. McDarby an additional $9 million in punitive damages. The same jury found Merck not liable for the heart attack of 60-year-old Thomas Cona, a second plaintiff in the trial, but was liable for fraud in the sale of the drug to Cona.

In March 2010, an Australian class-action lawsuit against Merck ruled that Vioxx doubled the risk of heart attacks, and that Merck had breached the Trade Practices Act by selling a drug which was unfit for sale.

By November 2007 Merck announced that it agreed on a mass tort settlement of $4.85 billion between Merck and the lawyers of 27,000 individual lawsuits with a try-every-case strategy as opposed to a class action lawsuit if "85 percent of the plaintiffs sign up". After the settlement, the lawyers for the case disputed the $315 million awarded in legal fees. Ultimately, the judge determined how the fees would be awarded to the plaintiff's attorneys. Judge Eldon E. Fallon of the United States District Court for the Eastern District of Louisiana additionally ordered the plaintiff lawyers to cap their fees at 32% of the settlement amount.

The above dispute over lawyer fees has caused scholars and observers to consider tort reform throughout the country. Articles on the subject include The Vioxx Litigation: A Critical Look at Trial Tactics, the Tort System, and the Roles of Lawyers in Mass Tort Litigation and 10 Years of Tort Reform in Texas Bring Fewer Suits, Lower Payouts.

In November 2011, Merck announced a civil settlement with the US Attorney's Office for the District of Massachusetts, and individually with 43 US states and the District of Columbia, to resolve civil claims relating to Vioxx.  Under the terms of the settlement, Merck agreed to pay two-thirds of a previously recorded $950 million reserve charge in exchange for release from civil liability.  Litigation with seven additional states remains outstanding.  Under separate criminal proceedings, Merck pleaded guilty to a federal misdemeanor charge relating to the marketing of the drug across state lines, incurring a fine of $321.6 million.

Possible return to market
In November 2017, Massachusetts-based Tremeau Pharmaceuticals announced its plan to return rofecoxib (TRM-201) to market as a treatment for hemophilic arthropathy (HA).  Tremeau announced that the FDA had granted an orphan designation for TRM-201 (rofecoxib) for the treatment of HA, and that they had received FDA feedback on their development plan.  HA is a degenerative joint disease caused by recurrent intra-articular bleeding.  It is the largest cause of morbidity in patients with hemophilia and has no currently approved treatment options in the United States.  Traditional NSAIDs are avoided in this population due to their effects on platelet aggregation and risk of gastrointestinal ulcers, and high potency opioids are the current standard of care in treating HA.

In March 2019 Tremeau announced that they had hired as chief development officer a former Merck employee who had been a product development team leader and also was responsible for executive oversight for numerous clinical trials for the COX-2 inhibitor VIOXX (rofecoxib).  Tremeau also announced an upcoming clinical trial for rofecoxib and were seeking investigators.

On February 15, 2022, California-based BriOri Biotech announced that it had been issued a patent covering topical formulations of rofecoxib.

See also 
 COX-2 selective inhibitor
 Discovery and development of cyclooxygenase 2 inhibitors
 David Graham (epidemiologist)

Footnotes

References 

 FDA (2005). "Summary minutes for the February 16, 17 and 18, 2005, Joint meeting of the Arthritis Advisory Committee and the Drug Safety and Risk Management Advisory Committee." Published on the internet, March 2005. Link
 
 Grassley CE (15 Oct 2004). Grassley questions Merck about communication with the FDA on Vioxx. Press Release.
 
 
 
 Merck & Co., (5 Nov 2004). Response to Article by Juni et al. Published in The Lancet on Nov. 5. Press Release.
 Merck & Co (30 Sep 2004) Merck Announces Voluntary Worldwide Withdrawal of VIOXX. Press release .
 
 
 
 
 
 Targum, SL. (1 Feb. 2001) Review of cardiovascular safety database. FDA memorandum.

External links 

 Court TV's full coverage of the Vioxx civil trials
 Merck website on Vioxx litigation
David Michaels. Doubt is Their Product Scientific American, June 2004, p. 96-101
JURIST, Much Pain, Much Gain: Skeptical Ruminations on the Vioxx Litigation
Ted Frank, American Enterprise Institute, The Vioxx Litigation, Part I and Part II, December 2005
 briandeer.com - Vioxx: the UK connection
 Campaign for compensation for Vioxx victims outside the US

Withdrawn drugs
Merck & Co. brands
Nonsteroidal anti-inflammatory drugs
COX-2 inhibitors
Benzosulfones
Furanones